Cladosporium caryigenum is a synonym of Fusicladium effusum, the plant pathogen which causes pecan scab. Pecan scab is the most economically significant disease of pecan (Carya illinoinensis) in the southeastern United States. In 2010, Seyran and colleagues used sequencing of the mitochondrial gene for cytochrome b to conclusively classify the pecan scab fungus as Fusicladium effusum.

References

External links 
 Index Fungorum
 USDA ARS Fungal Database

Fungal tree pathogens and diseases
Nut tree diseases
Cladosporium
Fungi described in 1982